Hesperomeles is a genus of South American evergreen trees of the family Rosaceae that has sometimes been included along with Pyracantha in the genus Osteomeles. However, Osteomeles notably have compound leaves, and recent molecular phylogenetics suggests that Hesperomeles is only distantly related to Osteomeles, and is instead sister to the Crataegus—Mespilus clade.

Species
Depending on the author, there are between 12 and 20 species in the genus. According to Tropicos.org database, the following species are recognized:

References

External links
 
 
 

Maleae
Rosaceae genera